Oriental is an unincorporated community located within Susquehanna Township, Juniata County, Pennsylvania, United States. In 1855, settler Amos Miller started a store which operated for ten years, and a post office was established prior to the American Civil War. By 1910, the population was 130.

References

Unincorporated communities in Juniata County, Pennsylvania
Unincorporated communities in Pennsylvania